Wesley Ashton Gordon,  (February 11, 1884 – February 9, 1943) was a Canadian politician.

Born in Owen Sound, Ontario, he was a barrister before being elected to the House of Commons of Canada for the riding of Timiskaming South in 1930. He was defeated by Walter Little in 1935. From 1930 to 1932, he was the Minister of Immigration and Colonization. From 1930 to 1935, he was the Minister of Mines. From 1932 to 1935, he was the Minister of Immigration and Colonization (Acting) and Minister of Labour.

He married Jean Benella Harness in 1909. He had three kids, Adam Gordon, Donnie Shack, and Wesley Gordon. Adam Gordon grew up to be a doctor. Wesley Gordon is planning to be a funny actor.

References
 

1884 births
1943 deaths
Conservative Party of Canada (1867–1942) MPs
Members of the House of Commons of Canada from Ontario
Members of the King's Privy Council for Canada